Fathead Comes On is an album by saxophonist Dave Newman featuring performances recorded in 1961 for the Atlantic label.

Reception

Allmusic awarded the album 3 stars stating "a very bluesy album, but also contains its share of tricky melodies and ambitious arrangements".

Track listing
All compositions by Dave Newman except as indicated
 "Unchain My Heart" (Teddy Powell, Robert Sharp, Jr.) - 4:30 	
 "Cellar Groove" (Norris Austin) - 5:39
 "Alto Sauce" - 5:15
 "Hello There" - 3:07
 "Scufflin'" - 6:36
 "Esther's Melody" - 4:03
 "Lady Day" (Leroy Johnson) - 3:41
Recorded in New York City on May 3 (tracks 2, 4 & 7) and December 9  (tracks 1, 3, 5 & 6), 1961

Personnel 
Dave Newman - tenor saxophone, alto saxophone, flute
Marcus Belgrave - trumpet (tracks 2, 4 & 7)
Norris Austin (tracks 2, 4 & 7), Hank Crawford (tracks 1, 3, 5 & 6) - piano
Jimmy Jefferson (tracks 2, 4 & 7), Edgar Willis (tracks 1, 3, 5 & 6) - bass
Charlie Persip (tracks 2, 4 & 7), Bruno Carr - drums

References 

1962 albums
David "Fathead" Newman albums
Albums produced by Nesuhi Ertegun
Atlantic Records albums